The Honda Vario (also known as the Honda Click in some Southeast Asian countries) is a scooter produced by Astra Honda Motor in Indonesia since 2006. This scooter is intended to anticipate the increasing population of automatic scooters circulating in the Indonesian motorcycle market.

References

External links 

  
  

Vario
Motor scooters